Kanihama, formerly known as Gund Kawarhama, is a village situated on the Srinagar-Gulmarg road in the Budgam district of Jammu and Kashmir in India. The Kani Shawls produced in the area were given a geographical indication status by the government of Jammu and Kashmir, making it illegal to sell shawls made outside of the Kanihama area as Kani shawls.

Kanihama is surrounded by Narbal Block towards east, Magam Block towards west, Pattan Block towards north, Badgam Block towards South.
This place is near the border of the Budgam and Baramulla district.

Kanihama was given a status of handloom village by the government of Jammu and Kashmir as the village is primarily known for its handloom products like Pashmina Shawal, Kani Shawl, etc. all over the globe. Under the project the village is being beautified and developed to encourage the tourism. A public school was established in 2015.

See also
Gogjigund
 Ichgam
 Budgam
 Srinagar

References

External links
Vale of Kashmir

Villages in Budgam district